Gasoline Alley is the second solo studio album by the British singer-songwriter Rod Stewart. It was released on 12 June 1970 by Vertigo Records. It is a collection of covers combined with Stewart's own compositions.  Like many of Stewart's solo albums from the period, it featured significant musical contributions from the other members of his band Faces.

Reception
The album was well received, with Langdon Winner of Rolling Stone feeling that Stewart had "a rare sensitivity for the delicate moments in a person's existence", and that this, Stewart's second solo album, was the work "of a supremely fine artist".

Track listing

Personnel
 Rod Stewart – lead vocals, acoustic guitar on "Jo's Lament"
 Ronnie Wood – guitar, acoustic guitar, bass guitar
 Martin Quittenton – acoustic guitar
 Stanley Matthews – mandolin
 Ronnie Lane – bass on "My Way Of Giving" and "You're My Girl", backing vocals on "My Way Of Giving"
 Pete Sears – piano on "Country Comforts", bass on “Cut Across Shorty”.
 Ian McLagan – piano, Hammond organ (the credit list notes: "Mac not available due to bus strike". However, the US release credits him, suggesting he was dubbed later)
 Mick Waller – drums
 Kenney Jones – drums on "My Way Of Giving" and "You're My Girl"
 William Gaff – whistle
 Dennis O'Flynn, Dick Powell – violin
 Jack Reynolds – backing vocals on "Country Comfort"

Production
 Producers – Rod Stewart and Lou Reizner
 Mastering – Gilbert Kong at Masterdisk (New York, NY)
 Album Design and Photography – Marcus Keef at Colbeck Mews, Kensington

Weekly charts

Notable covers by other artists

Elkie Brooks later achieved a hit with a version of the title track in 1983.

Long John Baldry (with whom Stewart had previously worked in the bands Hoochie Coochie Men and Steampacket) covered the title song for his 1973 album Good To Be Alive.

References

External links
Album online on Radio3Net a radio channel of Romanian Radio Broadcasting Company

1970 albums
Rod Stewart albums
Mercury Records albums
Vertigo Records albums
Albums produced by Rod Stewart
Albums produced by Lou Reizner
Albums recorded at Morgan Sound Studios